Zhili Army may refer to:
 Zhili Army (Fengtian clique)
 Zhili Army (Zhili clique)